Germanville is a ghost town in Cuming County, Nebraska, United States.

History
A post office was established at Germanville in 1898, and remained in operation until it was discontinued in 1902. A share of the early settlers being natives of Germany caused the name to be selected.

References

Geography of Cuming County, Nebraska